Yves Allegro and Roger Federer were the defending champions, but Federer chose not to participate, and only Allegro competed that year.
Allegro partnered with Marat Safin, but lost in the semifinals to Michael Kohlmann and Rainer Schüttler.

Fabrice Santoro and Nenad Zimonjić won in the final 6–0, 6–4, against Michael Kohlmann and Rainer Schüttler.

Seeds

Draw

Draw

External links
 Draw

Doubles